This is a list of Danish television related events from 1965.

Events

Debuts

Television shows

Ending this year

Births

1 June - Camilla Miehe-Renard, TV host
6 September - Peter Hansen, TV host & producer
23 September - Morten Lindberg, singer, comedian & TV host
21 November - Anne-Grethe Bjarup Riis, actress

Deaths

See also
 1965 in Denmark